Siluan Mănuilă (born 16 September 1971 as Cristian Constantin Mănuilă) is a bishop of the Romanian Orthodox Church. He is the bishop of the Diocese of Gyula since 2007 and was the leader of the Diocese of Dacia Felix from 2017 to 2022.

He completed his secondary education in Arad, Romania, continuing his theological studies in Sibiu and later in Athens, Greece. He went to Hungary in 1999, after the election of Sofronie Drincec as bishop of the Diocese of Gyula. In 2002, Mănuilă was named hegumen of the skete Adormirea Maicii Domnului (Assumption of the Virgin Mary) in Körösszakál. In 2003, he was appointed archimandrite and received the patriarchal cross, and until 2007, he was the cultural assessor of the Diocese of Gyula. Mănuilă was elected bishop of the diocese on 11 March 2007, taking office on 8 July. On 4 August 2014, the President of Romania Traian Băsescu awarded him and many other bishops the Order of Cultural Merit for their efforts in getting involved in the lives of the Romanian diaspora in other countries (Hungary in Mănuilă's case).

On 1 August 2017, Mănuilă also became leader of the Diocese of Dacia Felix in Serbia due to health problems of the previous bishop, Daniil Stoenescu.

References

Bishops of the Romanian Orthodox Church
1971 births
Living people
Romanians in Hungary
Romanian Orthodox Church in Hungary
Romanian Orthodox Church in Serbia
Recipients of the Order of Cultural Merit (Romania)
Christian clergy in Hungary